Littleberry James Haley (December 6, 1832 – February 8, 1917) was an American minister and politician who served in the Virginia House of Delegates, representing Louisa County.

References

External links 

1832 births
1917 deaths
Democratic Party members of the Virginia House of Delegates
20th-century American politicians
People from Louisa, Virginia